The Nedlouc River is a tributary of the Leaf River of northern Quebec, Canada, ultimately flowing into Ungava Bay. Its source is Nedlouc Lake.

Geography 
The Nedlouc River flows north-westwards to become a right tributary of the Leaf River which flows eastwards to the west coast of Ungava Bay. The Nedlouc River flows in the unorganized territory Rivière-Koksoak, in the region of Nunavik, in the administrative region of Nord-du-Québec. 

The watershed neighbors of Nedlouc river are:
 North side: Leaf River;
 East side: Duvert lake, Kakiattukallak lake, Grammont lake;
 South side: Rivière aux Mélèzes, Dupire lake, Nedlouc Lake;
 West side: Dyonnet lake, Minto Lake.

Its waters come from Nedlouc Lake (area 44 km²). This lake is located about 260 kilometers southwest of Kuujjuaq, Quebec. Having a complex shape, this lake contains two main areas, that are joined together by means of a fast.

The mouth of the lake is located in the northern part of the lake, looking like a tangle of lakes, peninsulas, islands and bays.

From the Nedlouc Lake, the river flows over 5.7 km to the northeast, crosses a lake (elevation: 313 m) over 2,6 km, then flows over 58.9 kilometers to northwest across several fast to its mouth where the current flows on the southern bank of the Leaf River. The mouth of the Nedlouc river is located in front of another river and downstream of Minto lake, as well as 2.3 km downstream from the mouth of rivers Daunais (north shore), downstream of the Irsuaq (south side) and downstream of the Carpenter River (south shore) which are tributaries of the Leaf River.

Toponymy

From Inuit origin, the place name "Nedlouc" means "calves" or "the thigh above the knee." The link is unknown between the lake and Nedlouc toponymique meaning. Inuit designated the lake: "Nallualuk" and "Tasirtuuq"; this second name means "great lakes".

In 1951, the "Commission de géographie du Québec" (Quebec Geographic Board) formalized the name "Lake Nedluc". The spelling "Nedluk" has been used in history to designate this lake; the latter appears on the Ungava district card in the Ninth Report of the Geographical Board of Canada prepared by James White (1911) 

The place name Nedlouc River was formalized on December 5, 1968 to the Commission de toponymie du Québec (Quebec Names Board).

Notes and references

See also 
 Charpenter River, a stream
 Nedlouc Lake, the source of the Nedlouc River 
 Minto lake, a body of water
 Koksoak river, unorganized territory
 Nunavik

Rivers of Nord-du-Québec